The Wooden Church is a church in Porţ, Romania, built in 1792.

References

External links
 Biserica de Lemn

Bibliography 
 Cristache-Panait, Ioana (14 August 1978). „Biserica Înălțarea Domnului din Porț”. Monumente istorice bisericești din Eparhia Ortodoxă Română a Oradei. Biserici de lemn: 373–376, Oradea.
 Studii regionale Cristache-Panait, Ioana (14 August 1971). „Bisericile de lemn din Sălaj”. Buletinul Monumentelor Istorice 1971 (1): 31–40.
 Ghergariu, Leontin (14 August 1973). „Meșterii construcțiilor monumentale de lemn din Sălaj”. AMET 1971-73: 255–273, Cluj.
 Godea, Ioan (14 August 1996). Biserici de lemn din România (nord-vestul Transilvaniei). București: Editura Meridiane. 

Historic monuments in Sălaj County
Churches completed in 1792
Port
Wooden churches in Sălaj County